Lookingglass Creek is a stream in the U.S. state of Oregon, located in Union County.

See also
 List of rivers of Oregon

References

Rivers of Union County, Oregon
Rivers of Oregon